Union of the Left (L'Union de la gauche), was a leftist, social-democratic and social-liberal coalition of political parties in France.

Members 
The Union of the Left generally associate two or more of the following parties, under the leading of the Socialist Party.
Socialist Party
Communist Party
Europe Ecology – The Greens
Radical Party of the Left
Citizen and Republican Movement
Miscellaneous left

European Parliament election, 2014
Socialist Party
Radical Party of the Left

French Communist Party
Left-wing political party alliances
Defunct political party alliances in France
Socialist Party (France)